Delft is a township on the outskirts of Cape Town, South Africa. It is situated next to the Cape Town International Airport, Belhar, Blue Downs, Ikwezi Park, Mandalay,Luzuko, Phillipi East and Site C, Khayelitsha. It is known for its recreational events, youth empowerment organizations such as Enkosi Foundation and the community has establish a motherbody organisation, the Delft Community Development Forum. Delft is a community that consists of numerous government built housing projects such as the N2 Gateway. In 2022 Deft was the fastest growing community in Cape Town.

History
Delft was established in 1989. It is a rapidly expanding community found within District D: Tygerberg. This community was originally established as an integrated service land project for 'coloureds' and 'blacks'.

Geography and demographics
Delft is situated approximately 34 km east of Cape Town, and approximately 7.5 km from Bellville. It was established to be one of Cape Town's first mixed race township including coloured and black residents. In 2000, it had a population between 25,000 and 92,000 inhabitants.

According to the 2011 census, Delft was 51% Coloured and 46% Black African with 3% "other". The dominant first languages are Afrikaans and Xhosa while English is widely used as second language. The majority of residents have not finished their matric. Official unemployment levels are at about 43% (although unofficially, this might be much higher).

Much of Delft consists of government housing projects. The newest projects are the Symphony which is the main part of the N2 Gateway Pilot Project as well as Temporary Relocation Areas (TRAs) such as Tsunami and the Symphony Way TRA.

Subdivisions
Delft is a big township. It is divided into 7 places (divisions) namely Delft South (also known as Suburban), Voorbrug, Leiden (Delft Central), Eindhoven, Roosendal, The Hague and the new Symphony section. Delft South is predominantly populated by Xhosa-speaking people, Leiden (Delft Central) is a mixed community of both Xhosa-speaking and Afrikaans-speaking people. Voorbrug, The Hague, Roosendal and Eindhoven are predominantly populated by Afrikaans-speaking coloured people.

In the news
In 2008, Delft was in the news because of the controversial N2 Gateway housing project. The shackdwellers of Joe Slovo Informal Settlement in Cape Town have publicly refused to be forcibly removed to Delft. Also, in December 2008, backyard dwellers occupied over 1,000 N2 Gateway houses in the new Symphony section of Delft. DA Councillor Frank Martin who was accused of inciting thousands of poor people to occupy these houses. Eventually, the families who occupied the houses were violently evicted by police who used rubber bullets to put down the protest. News of the violent repression reached international news with some people saying that it has severely hurt South Africa's reputation. Evicted residents are now living in makeshift shacks on Symphony Way which has widely become known as "Blikkiesdorp" across from the houses. This was believed to have been temporary housing for the evicted dwellers; however, they are still occupying "Blikkiesdorp" for the past five years.

Land use
 Blikkiesdorp
 Symphony Way Pavement Dwellers

References

Housing in South Africa
Townships in the Western Cape
Suburbs of Cape Town